Uranyl hydroxide is a hydroxide of uranium with the chemical formula  UO2(OH)2 in the monomeric form and (UO2)2(OH)4 in the dimeric; both forms may exist in normal aqueous media.  Uranyl hydroxide hydrate is precipitated as a colloidal yellowcake from oxidized uranium liquors near neutral pH.

Uranyl hydroxide was once used in glassmaking and ceramics in the colouring of the vitreous phases and the preparation of pigments for high temperature firing. The introduction of alkaline diuranates (like sodium diuranate) into glasses leads to yellow by transmission, green by reflection; moreover these glasses become dichroic and fluorescent under ultraviolet rays. 

Uranyl hydroxide is teratogenic and radioactive.

References

 The Structure of the a Form of Uranyl Hydroxide
 Alexander, C.A. (2005) "Volatilization of urania under strongly oxidizing conditions," Journal of Nuclear Materials, 346, 312–318.

Uranyl compounds
Hydroxides